Kristina Barrois and Anna-Lena Grönefeld were the defending champions, but Grönefeld decided not to participate. Barrois partnered up with Yvonne Meusburger, but lost in the final to Kiki Bertens and Anne Keothavong.

Kiki Bertens and Anne Keothavong won the title defeating Kristina Barrois and Yvonne Meusburger in the final 6–3, 6–3.

Seeds

Draw

Draw

References
 Main Draw

Buschl Open - Doubles
Ismaning Open
2011 in German tennis